Thumper is the first EP by the Australian rock band Man in the Wood and the second and final release before the name change to Tlot Tlot a year later. It was released in 1990 on Manhole Productions. It was only released on vinyl.

The songs on Thumper are darker than the band's future output as Tlot Tlot. They are even darker than Bolwell and Paulzen's future work with Merril Bainbridge. The EP jacket appears to depict three Hopi Kachina dolls.

Even though all the songs are credited to Bolwell and Paulzen on the album cover, a search of the APRA|AMCOS database reveals that the songs "Compressor", "Down on His Luck", "I Wept" and "Circus" were actually co-written by all three Man in the Wood members.

The "Samurai Glands" tracks are actually cut up and backmasked segments of the song "Glamour and the Sand" that appeared as a B-side to the "Rain" 7" in 1989. Part 1 is the final 16 seconds of the song, while part 2 is the intro and cut up versions of the first verse and chorus.

On this release, drummer/vocalist Stanley Paulzen is credited as "Jstanley Paulzen". This may seem to be a spelling mistake, but his name is also spelled this way on the credit for the back artwork.

The liner notes say the album was "recorded and mixed at studios various between 1989-90", however the liner notes to the "Rain" 7" reveal that that track was recorded at AVC Studios in Richmond between 1988 and 1989.

Track list

Singles 
 "Rain" b/w "Glamour and the Sand" (1989)

Personnel 
 Andrew Briant – lead guitar
 Owen Bolwell – bass, lead vocals
 Stanley Paulzen – drums, lead vocals
 Aka Setkya and Malcolm Dennis – producers
 Greg "Regsh" Fields – violin on "Car"
 Marlene and Rosalia Sieira – artwork (inner sleeve)
 Cover photo by Manhole
 Back cover photo by Stanley Paulzen with maraca from Marlene Sieira

References

External links 
 Thumper at Discogs

1990 EPs
Tlot Tlot albums